John Richard Spaven (22 November 1891–1971) was an English footballer who played in the Football League for Nottingham Forest.

References

1891 births
1971 deaths
English footballers
Association football forwards
English Football League players
Scarborough F.C. players
Goole Town F.C. players
Scunthorpe United F.C. players
Nottingham Forest F.C. players
Grantham Town F.C. players